The Empire State Railway, established in 1916, was an interurban railway that ran from Syracuse, New York, to Oswego, New York, a distance of . Streetcar service on the route ran until 1931 when it was abandoned in favor of buses.

References

Defunct railroads in Syracuse, New York
Defunct New York (state) railroads
Railway companies established in 1916
Railway companies disestablished in 1931
Interurban railways in New York (state)
Streetcars in New York (state)
American companies established in 1916